Caio Lucas Fernandes (born 19 April 1994), known as Caio Lucas or just Caio , is a Brazilian professional footballer who plays as a winger for Emirati Club Sharjah.

Career
Born in Araçatuba, São Paulo, Caio Lucas started playing football in 2002, aged 8, at local clubs SMER Bosque Araçatuba and América-SP. He then played for São Paulo's youth teams from 2005 to 2009 but could not become professional, so he left the club and unsuccessfully tried to join rivals Santos and Palmeiras before returning to América. In 2011, when he was prepared to give up on football, he was discovered by a Japanese university that was playing in Birigui, Brazil. Almost aged 17, he moved to Japan that year to enroll in Chiba Kokusai High School in Kimitsu, where he played for three years.

After his graduation, Caio Lucas joined the J1 League club, the Kashima Antlers in 2014. In his first professional season, under the coaching of Toninho Cerezo, Caio scored eight goals as Kashima Antlers qualified for the AFC Champions League. Moreover, he was named J. League's Young Player of the Year in 2014 and won the 2016 J1 League and 2015 J.League Cup. In 2019, following a three-year spell with Emirati club Al Ain, with whom he reached the 2018 FIFA Club World Cup Final, Caio signed a four-year contract with Portuguese club Benfica.

On 23 January 2020, Sharjah signed Caio Lucas from Benfica on loan for 18 months .

Career statistics

Club

Honours
Kashima Antlers
J1 League: 2016
J.League Cup: 2015

Al Ain
UAE Pro-League: 2017–18
UAE President's Cup: 2017–18

 Sharjah 
UAE Pro League: 2018–19

Individual
J.League Rookie of the Year: 2014
FIFA Club World Cup Silver Ball: 2018

References

External links

1994 births
Living people
People from Araçatuba
Brazilian footballers
Brazilian expatriate footballers
Expatriate footballers in Japan
Expatriate footballers in the United Arab Emirates
Expatriate footballers in Portugal
Brazilian expatriate sportspeople in Japan
Brazilian expatriate sportspeople in the United Arab Emirates
Brazilian expatriate sportspeople in Portugal
J1 League players
Kashima Antlers players
UAE Pro League players
Al Ain FC players
Sharjah FC players
Primeira Liga players
S.L. Benfica footballers
Association football wingers
Footballers from São Paulo (state)